Wietske Annechien de Ruiter (born March 20, 1970 in Ridderkerk) is a former female field hockey striker from the Netherlands, who represented her native country at two consecutive Summer Olympics: 1992 and 1996. At the last tournament in Atlanta, Georgia the former player of Hockey Vereniging Victoria in Rotterdam (where she started her career) and HGC won the bronze medal with the Dutch women's team.

References
  Dutch Olympic Committee
 KNHB Profile
  sports-reference

External links
 

1970 births
Living people
Dutch female field hockey players
Olympic field hockey players of the Netherlands
Field hockey players at the 1992 Summer Olympics
Field hockey players at the 1996 Summer Olympics
Olympic bronze medalists for the Netherlands
Sportspeople from Ridderkerk
Olympic medalists in field hockey
Medalists at the 1996 Summer Olympics
HGC players
20th-century Dutch women
20th-century Dutch people
21st-century Dutch women